"Vicinity of Obscenity" is a song and a promotional single by Armenian-American heavy metal band System of a Down, released in May 2006 to promote the release of the digital version of "Lonely Day", released in the United Kingdom on May 29, 2006. It is the ninth track on the album Hypnotize.

Lead singer Serj Tankian has stated that "Vicinity of Obscenity" was inspired by dadaism.

Track listing

Reception 
CMJ New Music Monthly stated that the song "erupts with multiple personalities, bridging Zappa-like nonsense ('terracotta pie-hey!') and Prince-like soul about every three seconds".

References 

System of a Down songs
2005 songs
2006 singles
American Recordings (record label) singles
Columbia Records singles
Songs written by Serj Tankian
Avant-garde metal songs
Novelty songs